Meriden is an unincorporated crossroads in Laramie County, Wyoming, United States. It has a post office, zip code 82081.

The community was named after Meriden, Connecticut.

Public education in the community of Meriden is provided by Laramie County School District #2.

Geography

Horse Creek runs through Meriden.

Highways
 U.S. Highway 85 - north to Torrington, south to Cheyenne.

Notable people
 C.B. Irwin (1875-1934) - rancher, rodeo champion, rodeo producer, hall of fame inductee, had the Y6 ranch on Horse Creek
 "Suicide" Ted Elder (1891-1981) - rancher, rodeo cowboy, Roman racer, World Champion rodeo trick rider, Hollywood actor and stuntman, inventor, hall of fame inductee, worked on C.B. Irwin's ranch

References

Unincorporated communities in Wyoming
Unincorporated communities in Laramie County, Wyoming